George Magan (born 16 July 1894) was an Irish Gaelic footballer who played as a right wing-forward for the Kildare senior team.

A noted sportsman of his era, Magan made his first appearance for the team during the 1918 championship and was a regular member of the starting fifteen until his retirement after the 1925 championship. During that time he won one All-Ireland medal and one Leinster medal.

At club level Magana played with the Celbridge team.

References

1894 births
Year of death missing
Garda Síochána officers
Kildare inter-county Gaelic footballers
Meath Gaelic footballers
Winners of one All-Ireland medal (Gaelic football)
Celbridge Gaelic footballers